The Mission of the State of Palestine in the Federal Republic of Germany is the diplomatic mission of the Palestine in Germany in the absence of fully normalized relations. It is located in Berlin. The German Democratic Republic (GDR, East Germany) recognized the State of Palestine in 1988 prior to the German reunification in 1990 with West Germany. It was only recently upgraded to a diplomatic mission from a representative office as part of the normalization of relations between the two countries

See also

List of diplomatic missions in Germany.
List of diplomatic missions of Palestine.

References

Diplomatic missions of the State of Palestine
Diplomatic missions in Berlin
Germany–State of Palestine relations